Tamlyn Naomi Tomita (born January 27, 1966) is a Japanese–born American actress. She made her screen debut as Kumiko in The Karate Kid Part II (1986) and reprised the character for the streaming series Cobra Kai (2021). She is also well known for her role as Waverly in The Joy Luck Club (1993). Additional films include Come See the Paradise (1990), Picture Bride (1994), Four Rooms (1995), Robot Stories (2003), The Day After Tomorrow (2004) and Gaijin 2: Love Me as I Am (2005).

Tomita also has played several recurring roles on television series, including 24, Glee, Teen Wolf and How to Get Away with Murder. She starred on the Epix drama series Berlin Station (2016), and in 2017 began starring in the ABC medical drama The Good Doctor. In 2020, she had a recurring role in Star Trek: Picard.

Early life
Tamlyn Tomita, a first generation Japanese-American (issei), was born January 27, 1966, on a military base in Okinawa and grew up in Los Angeles. Her Japanese-American father was in an internment camp during World War II. He met her mother while stationed in Okinawa between the Korean and Vietnam Wars. Her mother was of half-Okinawan Japanese and half-Filipino descent, born in Manila and emigrated to Okinawa after World War II. Her father became an LAPD officer upon returning to Los Angeles.

Tomita graduated from Granada Hills High School and attended University of California, Los Angeles (UCLA), where she studied history and planned to become a history teacher. While a junior at UCLA, she participated in Nisei Week, where she was crowned its 1984 queen. She and several other Japanese-American girls were asked by Helen Funai, the 1963 pageant queen, to audition for the role of Kumiko in The Karate Kid II. She promised her parents that she would finish college, and then explore acting.

Career

Film
After The Karate Kid II, Tomita had major roles in a number of independent movies. Her biggest role was in the 1990 drama film Come See the Paradise. In 1993, she co-starred opposite Ming-Na Wen in the ensemble cast drama The Joy Luck Club and the next year she had a role in the 1994 independent film Picture Bride. In 1995 Tomita appeared alongside Antonio Banderas in the Robert Rodriguez-directed segment of the vignette anthology comedy Four Rooms.

In the 21st Century, Tomita has had roles in other independent films and co-starred in several major Hollywood productions, including playing Janet Tokada in The Day After Tomorrow. In 2005, she starred in the Brazilian drama film Gaijin 2: Love Me as I Am and also had a leading role in the independent film Robot Stories in 2003. She was also in Only the Brave about the Japanese American segregated fighting unit, the 442nd Regimental Combat Team of World War II, which included two other Karate Kid stars, Yuji Okumoto and Pat Morita.

Television
Tomita appeared as a character named Ming Li on the NBC daytime soap opera Santa Barbara from May to September 1988. In 1994, she guest-starred in the first episode of season 3 of Highlander: The Series.  In 2008, she made her return to daytime soaps with a recurring role on ABC's General Hospital. In 2012, she had another recurring role on NBC's Days of Our Lives.

From 1996 to 1997, Tomita was a regular cast member in the short-lived UPN drama series, The Burning Zone. In 1993, she starred in the pilot movie for Babylon 5. During her career she has guest starred on shows such as Seven Days; Quantum Leap; Living Single; Murder, She Wrote; Chicago Hope; Will & Grace; Nash Bridges; The Shield; Strong Medicine; Stargate SG-1; Stargate: Atlantis; The Mentalist; Private Practice; True Blood; Zoo; Tour of Duty; Criminal Minds; and many other dramas and comedies. She had longer term recurring roles on Crossing Jordan, JAG, 24, Eureka, Heroes, Law & Order: Los Angeles, Glee, Teen Wolf, Resurrection, How to Get Away with Murder, and Chasing Life.

In 2016, Tomita played a series regular role on the Epix drama series Berlin Station. From 2017 to 2019 she was a recurring character on the ABC medical drama The Good Doctor.

Tomita began a recurring role as the Vulcan/Romulan hybrid Commodore Oh on the CBS All Access web television series Star Trek: Picard in 2020.

In 2021, she reprised her 1980s role as Kumiko for two episodes in Season 3 of Cobra Kai, a television sequel to the Karate Kid films.

Personal life 
Tomita is married to actor Daniel Blinkoff, whom she had dated for many years.

Filmography

Film

Television

Video games

References

External links

1966 births
Living people
Actresses from California
American actresses of Japanese descent
American film actresses
American film actors of Asian descent
American people of Filipino descent
American people of Ilocano descent
American people of Japanese descent
American people of Okinawan descent
American soap opera actresses
American television actresses
American video game actresses
American voice actresses
Granada Hills Charter High School alumni
Japanese emigrants to the United States
People from Okinawa Prefecture
University of California, Los Angeles alumni
2020 United States presidential electors
20th-century American actresses
21st-century American actresses